

This is a list of the National Register of Historic Places listings in Jackson County, Missouri.

This is intended to be a complete list of the properties and districts on the National Register of Historic Places in Jackson County, Missouri, United States. Latitude and longitude coordinates are provided for many National Register properties and districts; these locations may be seen together in a map.

There are 392 properties and districts listed on the National Register in the county, including 4 National Historic Landmarks and 1 National Historic Site. The portion of Kansas City in the county is the location of 341 of these properties and districts; they are listed separately, while the remaining 51 properties and districts, including all of National Historic Landmarks and the National Historic Site, are listed below.

Current listings

Listings in Kansas City

Exclusive of Kansas City

|}

See also
 List of National Historic Landmarks in Missouri
 National Register of Historic Places listings in Missouri

References

 
Jackson